United Nations Security Council Resolution 195 was adopted on October 9, 1964.  After examining the application of Malawi for membership in the United Nations, the Council recommended to the General Assembly that Malawi be admitted.

The resolution was adopted unanimously by all members of the council.

See also
List of United Nations Security Council Resolutions 101 to 200 (1953–1965)

References
Text of the Resolution at undocs.org

External links
 

 0195
 0195
1964 in Malawi
 0195
October 1964 events